The Ultimate Sports Quiz (USQ) is a national level inter-school sports quiz competition that is broadcast on Sony Sports Network in India.

Background 
Super Six Sports Gaming Private Limited (SSSG) is a sports tech start-up launched in the second half of 2019. The Ultimate Sports Quiz 2022 is presented by Harsha Bhogle. 

It is a 13-episode televised series.

Concept 
Traditionally, sports quizzing in India generates a lot of interest among student community as they follow sports from around the world. A sports quiz aired on India’s leading sports broadcaster back in the 2000s is still remembered and has a cult following even today. Encouraged by its impact and success, a national level sports quiz called the Ultimate Sports Quiz was conceptualized with the intent of bringing back the romance and nostalgia of the once popular cult quiz show.

Quiz Details 
The inaugural season of the Ultimate Sports Quiz featured 27 teams from 22 cities (65% non-metros) across the county. This competition is also an endeavor to support grass root level sports development as the top three teams that reach the national finals will be awarded a total prize pool of INR 1 Crore approx. for developing sports infrastructure in their respective schools. Students representing the three finalist teams will win a trip to a sporting destination of their choice anywhere in the world.

The schools are spread across the country, competing to be crowned the national champion of the inaugural season of the series.

Each school team was composed of two students nominated by the school to represent them in the competition. Students from class 6 to 10 are eligible to take part in the quiz.

2022 Quiz Structure 
Each quiz features three teams of two members each. There are 9 preliminary rounds.

Nine winners from preliminary stage qualify for the semi-final stage of the contest. There are 3 semi-finals and each winning team from these will compete in the National Finals.

Ultimate Sports Quiz Content & Format 
USQ features questions on popular sports around the world. It also has a fair amount of questions on Indian sports and sportspersons as well. The format of the quiz is modelled on the Olympic motto of – Citius, Altius, Fortius. The three rounds are designed to test speed and accuracy, depth of knowledge and ability to perform under pressure. The quiz encourages participation, sportsman spirit and is conducted in a fun environment.

Reference 

Quiz shows
Competitions in India
Sport in India